Nemophora albiciliellus is a moth of the family Adelidae. It is found in Spain.

The wingspan is 14-16.5 mm.

Taxonomy
This species was previously considered a synonym of Nemophora barbatellus.

References

External links
lepiforum.de

Moths described in 1859
Adelidae
Moths of Europe